Logan Glacier is a glacier in the U.S. state of Alaska and territory of Yukon, Canada. It heads down the northern side of the Mount Logan massif in the Yukon, flowing northwest across the Canada-United States boundary to form the headwaters of the Chitina River. It was named for its origin on the slopes of, and proximity to, Mount Logan.

See also
 List of glaciers
 Wrangell–St. Elias National Park and Preserve
 Kluane National Park and Reserve

Further reading 
 Chic Scott,  Pushing the Limits: The Story of Canadian Mountaineering, P. 97

References

Glaciers of Alaska
Glaciers of Copper River Census Area, Alaska
Glaciers of Unorganized Borough, Alaska
Glaciers of Yukon